Thanippiravi is a 1966 Indian Tamil-language film, directed by M. A. Thirumugam. It stars M. G. Ramachandran and Jayalalithaa. The film, produced by Sandow M. M. A. Chinnappa Thevar, was released on 16 September 1966, and was not commercially successful, having run for ten weeks in theatres.

Plot

Cast 

 M. G. Ramachandran as Muthaiya
 M. N. Nambiar as Sub-inspector Soundharam
 S. A. Ashokan as Rathnapuram
 C. L. Anandan as Ravi
 Nagesh as Chowry
 V. K. Ramasamy as Doreracy
 Athithyan as Singaram
 Tiruchi Selandhar Rajan as Madhasamy
 Sandow M. M. A. Chinnappa Thevar as the boss
 Jayalalithaa as Radha
 Revathi as Sivagami
 Manorama as Gowry
 P. K. Saraswathi as Meenatchi

Production 
In the film, Ramachandran's character initially sports a beard and beret, taking inspiration from the Argentine revolutionary Che Guevara.

Soundtrack 
The music was composed by K. V. Mahadevan, with lyrics by Kannadasan. The song "Uzhaikkum Kaigale" conveys Ramachandran's leftist beliefs, and highlights "the role of the worker in building society".

Release and reception 
Thanippiravi was released on 16 September 1966 in most centres, and on 18 September in Madras (now Chennai). Kalki said the film stood out compared to other Tamil films with regards to action and romance sequences. The film was not commercially successful, having run for ten weeks in theatres. Since Ramachandran and Jayalalithaa appeared as the gods Murugan and Valli in a dream sequence, many of the actors' fans worshipped pictures of the actors in their goddess avatars as if worshipping the actual gods.

References

External links 

1960s Tamil-language films
1966 films
Films directed by M. A. Thirumugam
Films scored by K. V. Mahadevan